The Winnipeg Wesmen are the athletic teams that represent the University of Winnipeg in Winnipeg, Manitoba, Canada. As an undergraduate school, the Wesmen participate in the sports of basketball, volleyball, and soccer in both the men's and women's divisions of U Sports. All home games are played at the Duckworth Centre, located on the university's downtown Winnipeg campus. The Wesmen previously competed in men's baseball as a single-sport member of the National Association of Intercollegiate Athletics (NAIA) until the program was cut after the 2017 season.

History of Wesmen Athletics 
The University of Winnipeg's athletic program has its roots in the intercollegiate sports teams that were formed in 1889 among Winnipeg schools. In 1962, the first professional Athletics Director, Blue Bomber player Ray Jauch, was appointed by United College. In 1963, the new Riddell Hall gymnasium was opened.  In 1966, the United College Student Council held a public competition to name its sports team. The name chosen was Wesmen, which combined "Wesley" and "Manitoba". The women's teams are the Wesmenettes or the Lady Wesmen.

In 1967, after the University of Winnipeg was incorporated, the Wesmen began competing across Canada with other University teams across Canada as a member of two sports governing bodies: the Western Intercollegiate Athletic Association and the Canadian Interuniversity Athletic Union. The main sports included were basketball, volleyball, and hockey (although hockey was not continued after 1984). The Wesmen also hosted tournaments, including the Wesmen Classic, which was previously known as the Golden Boy Classic (1967-1976).

In 1984, the Athletics Centre was opened at the University of Winnipeg. In 1992, the building was renamed as the Duckworth Centre in honour of Henry Duckworth, a past University President. In 2008, the Bill Wedlake Fitness Centre was added to the building. Most recently, the Axworthy Health and RecPlex, an adjoining fieldhouse for soccer and sports education, was built.

The Athletic Directors have been: Ray Jauch, from 1962 to 1964; Edward Vidruk, from 1964 to 1966; David Anderson, from 1966-1984; Glen Conly, 1973 (he covered David Anderson during a leave of absence); Aubrey Ferris, from 1984 to 2000; Bill Wedlake, from 2000 to 2008; Doran Reid, from 2009-2015; and Dave Crook, from 2015 to the present.

U Sports Championships

Volleyball has always been a popular sport in Manitoba and the University of Winnipeg Wesmen and University of Manitoba Bisons have frequently battled for the U Sports title. The Wesmen women hold the record with 7 national titles and were the first to win 6 consecutive titles between 1983 and 1988, this was a feat that was only later repeated once by the University of Alberta Pandas.

In recent years the men's volleyball side won the CIS championships for the 2006-07 season, defeating the University of Alberta 3 sets to 2, the following year in a rematch of the same final the Wesmen lost 3 sets to 1 finishing runner-up to Alberta this time.

In women's basketball the ladies made it to the national final against Simon Fraser in 2004-05 losing the final 60-50. The year before in the bronze medal match between the same two schools the Wesmen ladies won 65-62. In the mid 90s, Lady Westmen basketball was a national powerhouse.  The team would go on to a 118-1 record in the span from 1992-1995, including 3 CIS national basketball championships and beating several NCAA Women's Division I programs in North American tournaments.

Awards and honors

Canada West Hall of Fame
Wesmen Women's Basketball Team (1992–95): Canada West Hall of Fame - 2020 Inductee

References

External links
 

University of Winnipeg
U Sports teams
Sports teams in Winnipeg
Baseball teams in Winnipeg